Sırçalı Medrese (literally Glazed medrese) is a 13th-century medrese (Islamic school) in Konya, Turkey.

History
Built in 1242 during the reign of the Seljuk sultan Kaykaus II, by order of Emir Bedrettin Muslih for the study of Fiqh (Islamic doctrines). The interior is decorated with colourful tiles, hence the name of the structure. 
The building has a highly ornamented stone façade which includes relief work of various geometric patterning. Above the entrance is an inscription in Arabic calligraphy. The building has an open courtyard surrounded by two stories of the student cells and a large Iwan where the lectures took place.

The building now is Konya's Museum of Gravestones. It contains old Roman, Byzantine, Seljuk and Ottoman gravestones.

Gallery

References

External links

See also
 Seljuk eternity sign

Religious buildings and structures completed in 1242
Buildings and structures in Konya
Buildings and structures of the Sultanate of Rum
Educational institutions established in the 13th century
Archaeological museums in Turkey
Madrasas in Turkey